The following lists events that happened during 1908 in the Kingdom of Belgium.

Incumbents
Monarch: Leopold II
Prime Minister: Frans Schollaert (from 9 January)

Events

 9 January – Frans Schollaert formally takes office as prime minister, after the sudden death of Jules de Trooz at the end of the previous year.
 19 April – Confédération syndicale belge organization is founded.
 24 May – Partial legislative elections
 25 May – Parliament ratifies the 1907 copyright convention with Germany.
 14 June – Provincial elections
 10 July – Paul Van Asbroeck wins a gold medal at the 1908 Olympic Games
 30 September – Premiere of Maurice Maeterlinck's The Blue Bird at the Moscow Art Theatre
 18 October – Belgian Parliament passes the Colonial Charter on the Belgian annexation of the Congo Free State.
 30 October – Cabinet reshuffle with Jules Renkin becoming first Minister for Colonies
 15 November – Congo Free State becomes Belgian Congo

Publications
 Émile de Borchgrave, Souvenirs diplomatiques de quarante ans (Brussels)
 Fernand Crommelynck, Le sculpteur de masques (Brussels, Edmond Deman)
 Stijn Streuvels, Tieghem: Het Vlaamsche lustoord (Ghent, Vercauteren)
 Joseph Van den Gheyn, Catalogue des manuscrits de la Bibliothèque royale de Belgique, vol. 8.
 Emile Verhaeren, James Ensor (Brussels, G. Van Oest)

Art and architecture

Buildings
 Sint-Petrus-en-Pauluskerk, Ostend (begun 1899)

Films
 Durch Brüssel in 10 Minuten (9-minute documentary).

Births
 2 January – André Verbeke, architect (died 1978)
 23 January – Stanislas-André Steeman, writer (died 1970)
 14 March – Joseph André, priest (died 1973)
 14 May – Jules Lismonde, artist (died 2001)
 20 September – Simon Dewinter, boxer (died 1972)
 4 October – Celeste van Exem, missionary (died 1993)
 16 November – Sœur Emmanuelle, religious (died 2008)
 24 November – Hubert Ansiaux, banker (died 1987)
 28 November – Claude Lévi-Strauss, anthropologist (died 2009)

Deaths
 4 February – Albert Lancaster (born 1849), meteorologist
 6 February – Jan Portielje (born 1829), painter
 22 February – Édouard van den Corput (born 1821), physician
 10 May – Eugène Lafont (born 1837), missionary
 5 June – Jef Lambeaux (born 1852), sculptor
 21 June – Luís Cruls (born 1848), astronomer
 19 June – Louis van Waefelghem (born 1840), viola d'amore player
 4 August – Piet Verhaert (born 1852), painter
 24 December – François-Auguste Gevaert (born 1828), musicologist

References

 
1900s in Belgium
Belgium
Belgium
Years of the 20th century in Belgium